Sazonov is a rural locality (a khutor) in Generalovskoye Rural Settlement, Kotelnikovsky District, Volgograd Oblast, Russia. The population was 85 as of 2010.

Geography 
Sazonov is located on the left bank of the Aksay Yesaulovsky, 48 km northeast of Kotelnikovo (the district's administrative centre) by road. Novoaksaysky is the nearest rural locality.

References 

Rural localities in Kotelnikovsky District